Praça das Esculturas (Portuguese: Sculpture Square), also known as O Jardim das Esculturas ou Praça das Esculturas de Vaccarini, is a sculpture park in Altinópolis, in the state of São Paulo, Brazil. The park houses the works of the Italian-Brazilian artist Bassano Vaccarini (1914 - 2002).

Vaccarini emigrated to Brazil in 1946 after WW2 and worked as a set designer for the Teatro Brasileiro de Comédia. In 1980 he opened a studio in Altinópolis and the municipality became home to his works, which are primarily in concrete and depict women and families. In the design of the park Vaccarini grouped 42 sculptures on seven thematic monuments.

References

Brazilian sculpture
Sculptures in Brazil
Art museums established in 1992
1967 establishments in Brazil
Outdoor sculptures in Brazil